"If You Really Cared" is the third single from Gabrielle's second album Gabrielle. It was written by Gabrielle, Ben Barson of the Boilerhouse Boys, Ben Wolff and Andrew Dean. "If You Really Cared" returned Gabrielle to the top 20 of the UK Singles Chart, peaking at number 15.

Critical reception
A reviewer from Music Week rated the song three out of five, adding, "Gabrielle shows her class with this timeless ballad which captures a vintage soulful sound, but remains distinctly modern."

Track listings

Charts

References

1996 singles
1996 songs
Gabrielle (singer) songs
Songs written by Gabrielle (singer)
Go! Beat singles